Prince Giorgi Nikolozis dze Bagration of Mukhrani (1834-1882) was a Georgian nobleman of the House of Mukhrani.

Prince George was son of Prince Nicholas Bagration of Mukhrani and Princess Tamar Jorjadze.

George married Ekaterine Aleksi-Meskhishvili (1845-1905) and they had 17 children:
Revaz Bagration of Mukhrani
Rostevan Bagration of Mukhrani
Kaikhosro Bagration of Mukhrani
Jesse Bagration of Mukhrani
Giorgi Bagration of Mukhrani
Teimuraz Bagration of Mukhrani
Petre Bagration of Mukhrani
Vakhtang Bagration of Mukhrani (born 1862)
Levan Bagration of Mukhrani (1863-1901)
Niko Bagrationi "the Boer" (1865-1933)
Irakli Bagration of Mukhrani (born 1867)
Ivane Bagration of Mukhrani (1868-1889)
Mikheil Bagration of Mukhrani (1872-1942)
Alexander Bagration of Mukhrani (1873-1892)
David Bagration of Mukhrani (1877-1940)
Ilia Bagration of Mukhrani (1878-1885)
Tamar Bagration of Mukhrani (1881-1960)

References

 ბაგრატიონები: სამეცნიერო და კულტურული მემკვიდრეობა, მუხრან-ბატონთა და ბაგრატიონ-მუხრანელთა გენეალოგია, თბილისი, 2003
 მუხრანბატონთა გენეალოგიური ტაბულა: იური ჩიქოვანი, სოსო ბიჭიკაშვილი, დავით ნინიძე / კრებული "არტანუჯი" N 5 - 1996 წ. - გვ.28-36

1834 births
1882 deaths
House of Mukhrani